Rhodanthe floribunda, the common white sunray, is a herbaceous plant, a native of arid and semi arid areas in Australia. An annual plant in the daisy family, growing to 30 cm tall, flowering in spring. The specific epithet floribunda refers to an abundance of flowers.

This plant first appeared in scientific literature as Helipterum floribundum in 1838. Published in the Prodromus Systematis Naturalis Regni Vegetabilis by the Swiss botanist Augustin Pyramus de Candolle.

References

floribunda
Flora of New South Wales
Flora of Victoria (Australia)
Flora of Queensland
Flora of the Northern Territory
Flora of Western Australia
Flora of South Australia
Plants described in 1838